James Francis Williams (born October 4, 1943) is an American former professional baseball infielder, coach and manager in Major League Baseball (MLB). He was born in Santa Maria, California, and briefly appeared in two MLB seasons as a second baseman and shortstop for the St. Louis Cardinals. He has also coached for Toronto, the Atlanta Braves and Philadelphia Phillies.

Playing career
Williams, a former infielder who threw and batted right-handed, graduated from Arroyo Grande, California, High School and Fresno State University. He signed originally with the Boston Red Sox and was drafted by the St. Louis Cardinals in the 1965 Rule 5 draft. He appeared in 14 games for the Cards over two seasons 1966–67, but had only 13 at bats, compiling a batting average of .231. Although he was traded to the Cincinnati Reds after the 1967 season, then selected in the 1968 expansion draft by the Montreal Expos, he never appeared in an MLB game for either club. The first pitcher Williams ever faced was Sandy Koufax. He got his first hit off another Hall of Famer: Juan Marichal.

Coaching and managerial career

Early career, Toronto Blue Jays, and Atlanta Braves
His playing days cut short by a shoulder injury, Williams began his minor league managing career with the California Angels in 1974.  He soon reached the Triple-A level and was appointed the third base coach of the Toronto Blue Jays in 1980.

Williams remained as Toronto's third base coach for six seasons, until he was promoted to manager in 1986 when Bobby Cox left the organization to rejoin the Atlanta Braves. He was the Blue Jays' manager until the 1989 season, when he was fired May 14 and replaced by Cito Gaston after the team got off to a 12–24 start. Gaston went 77–49 for the rest of the season and won the American League East title. Williams finished with a record of 281 wins and 241 losses.

He spent 1991–96 with the Atlanta Braves as their third-base coach, working again under Bobby Cox, including the Braves 1995 World Series championship season. While with the Braves, Williams developed a reputation as an outstanding teaching coach, especially adept at working with infielders.

During the 1992 National League Championship Series, he waved home Sid Bream after seeing Barry Bonds having to make a difficult throw on a single while the game was tied in the ninth inning. Bream made the slide that would win the pennant for the Braves in that game.

Boston Red Sox

From 1997 to 2001, Williams managed the Red Sox, leading them to wild-card playoff berths in 1998 and 1999.  In 1999, the Red Sox reached the American League Championship Series, but lost to their arch-rivals, the New York Yankees, 4 games to 1.  Williams received the 1999 Major League Baseball Manager of the Year Award for the American League. Williams' relationship with general manager Dan Duquette soured, especially after Duquette publicly backed volatile outfielder Carl Everett after a September 2000 dispute with Williams. Red Sox fans routinely disparaged him on the Internet, using the epithet "Dumy."  When the Red Sox — depleted by injuries — slumped in August 2001, Duquette fired Williams. The club then lost 27 of 43 games under Duquette's appointee, Joe Kerrigan. Williams finished his tenure as Red Sox manager with a record of 414 wins and 352 losses.

Houston Astros and Philadelphia Phillies

In 2002, Williams became manager of the Houston Astros over candidates Jim Fregosi and Tony Pena. The Astros fell short by one game for the NL Central title to the Chicago Cubs, losing six of their last nine games. However, expectations were raised in the offseason when ownership signed pitchers Roger Clemens and Andy Pettitte. The 2004 season did not get off to a great start for Williams, and they went into the All-Star break at 44-44 after losing five of seven games in their last road trip before returning to Houston for the break. Williams was assigned to serve as a National League coach at the 2004 All-Star Game, held in Houston. When he was announced to the crowd at Houston's Minute Maid Park, he was greeted with jeers; the next morning, general manager Gerry Hunsicker fired him, citing the past week as a turning point. He was replaced by Phil Garner, who Hunsicker had contacted about taking the job earlier. 

Garner would lead the Astros to the 2004 National League Championship Series, but they fell one game short of going to Houston's first ever World Series (the following year, Garner led the Astros to the World Series). Williams finished with a record of 215 wins and 197 losses.

On October 16, 2006, Williams was named the Philadelphia Phillies bench coach and continued with that role through the Phillies 2008 World Series championship season. Williams decided not to return to his position for the 2009 season. Phillies manager Charlie Manuel said, "As far as I know, it's not like that he left on a bad note."

Managerial record

Relatives in baseball

Jimy Williams is not to be confused with James Bernard Williams (1926–2016), no relation, a Canadian former minor league outfielder and manager and MLB coach with the Astros and Baltimore Orioles. He is, however, a distant relative of Red Sox great Ted Williams, who was his staunch advocate when he managed in Boston.

Two of Jimy Williams' sons are former professional baseball players who have fashioned successful minor-league managing careers. Brady was chosen by the Red Sox in the 45th round of the 1999 Major League Baseball draft and had a seven-year playing career as an infielder in minor league and independent league baseball. Shawn Williams also had a seven-year playing career (2006–12), including four years in the Tampa Bay organization; primarily an infielder, he played every position but center fielder. He has been a skipper in the Phillies' farm system since 2014.

References

External links

1943 births
Living people
American expatriate baseball players in Canada
Arkansas Travelers players
Atlanta Braves coaches
Baseball coaches from California
Baseball players from California
Boston Red Sox managers
Buffalo Bisons (minor league) players
El Paso Diablos players
Fresno State Bulldogs baseball players
Houston Astros managers
Indianapolis Indians players
Major League Baseball bench coaches
Major League Baseball infielders
Major League Baseball third base coaches
Manager of the Year Award winners
People from Arroyo Grande, California
Philadelphia Phillies coaches
St. Louis Cardinals players
Sportspeople from Santa Maria, California
Tidewater Tides players
Toronto Blue Jays coaches
Toronto Blue Jays managers
Tulsa Oilers (baseball) players
Vancouver Mounties players
Waterloo Hawks (baseball) players
Winnipeg Whips players
Alaska Goldpanners of Fairbanks players